Scotia Sanctuary is a  nature reserve in the south-western plains of New South Wales, Australia, adjacent to the border with South Australia. It is owned and managed by the Australian Wildlife Conservancy (AWC).

History
Scotia comprises two former grazing properties, Tararra and Ennisvale, which were purchased by Earth Sanctuaries Limited in 1994, and eventually acquired by AWC in 2002.

Landscape and climate
Scotia is characterised by a low-relief landscape of plains with parallel sand dunes and open calcareous swales.  Surface water is limited by the sandy soils and there are no watercourses.  The climate is one of cool winters and hot summers in an arid region, with irregular rainfall averaging an annual .

Ecosystems
Scotia's habitats include various Eucalyptus open shrubland (mallee) communities and sheoak woodlands, .

Fauna
The Scotia Endangered Mammal Recovery Project is a program of reintroduction of mammals that have become extinct regionally, in order to establish viable, self-sustaining populations.  Species successfully reintroduced so far include: numbat, greater bilby, burrowing bettong, brush-tailed bettong and bridled nailtail wallaby, while an attempted reintroduction of the greater stick-nest rat failed. Threatened bird species present on Scotia include malleefowl, regent and scarlet-chested parrots, striated grasswren and black-eared miner.  The reserve forms part of the 12,200 km2 Riverland Mallee Important Bird Area, identified as such by BirdLife International for its importance in the conservation of mallee birds and their habitats.

References

External links
 Australian Wildlife Conservancy

Nature reserves in New South Wales
Australian Wildlife Conservancy reserves
1994 establishments in Australia
Important Bird Areas of New South Wales
Mallee Woodlands and Shrublands